"High Maintenance Woman" is a song co-written and recorded by American country music artist Toby Keith. It was released in February 2007 as the lead-off single from Toby's eleventh studio album Big Dog Daddy. Keith wrote the song single-handedly with additional writing credits from Tim Wilson and Danny Simpson. The track received positive reviews from critics who praised Keith's vocals and musicianship. "High Maintenance Woman" peaked at number three on the Billboard Hot Country Songs chart and number 67 on the Hot 100. The song achieved similar success in Canada, reaching the top 50 on the Canadian Hot 100.

Background and development
Although Keith was technically the sole writer of "High Maintenance Woman," he gave co-writers' credit to comedian and singer Tim Wilson and Danny Simpson (Wilson's frequent co-writing partner), largely because Wilson and Simpson had previously composed together an unrelated song that also contained a similar premise. On his official website, Keith states:

The song tells of an apartment-building maintenance man who is attempting, and failing, to attract the attention of an attractive woman who lives in an apartment in the complex, and lamenting that "a high-maintenance woman don't want no maintenance man". In colloquial usage predating Keith's use of the term, a "high maintenance woman" is a woman regarded as overly demanding or fussy.

Critical reception
Kevin John Coyne, reviewing the song for Country Universe, gave it an A− rating. Despite the story being told many times before and containing a "jaw-droppingly tacky double entendre", Coyne called it "a fantastic single" due to its writing and Keith's vocal performance. Kathi Kamen Goldmark of Common Sense Media praised the song's lead guitar and rhythm section for emitting catchy energy and the "memorably clever" lyricism. Entertainment Weekly writer Ken Tucker highlighted this and "Wouldn't Wanna Be Ya" for their clever vocalization and wordplay.

Music video
The music video was directed by Michael Salomon and was released in early 2007. The guitar used in the video was a custom made Rockit Guitar built by Rod "Hot Rod" MacKenzie.

Chart performance
"High Maintenance Woman" debuted at number 73 on the Billboard Hot 100 the week of March 3, 2007. Thirteen weeks later, it reached number 67 the week of June 2 and left the chart two weeks later. The song reappeared on the Hot 100 the week of June 30 at number 100 before leaving completely, staying on the chart for seventeen weeks. In Canada, the song debuted at number 78 on the Canadian Hot 100 the week of March 31. Six weeks later, it peaked at number 50 the week of May 12, remaining on the chart for thirteen weeks.

Year-end charts

References

2007 singles
2007 songs
Toby Keith songs
Songs written by Toby Keith
Show Dog-Universal Music singles
Music videos directed by Michael Salomon